The  S. C. Dobson  is a Chesapeake Bay log canoe, built about 1895, by James Lowery at Tilghman, Maryland. She measures 33'-1" (10.1 meters) and has a beam of 6'-6" (2 meters). She has a longhead bow, a sharp stern, and a narrow, straight-sided hull. With a Tilghman racing rig she races under No. 6. She one of the last 22 surviving traditional Chesapeake Bay racing log canoes that carry on a tradition of racing on the Eastern Shore of Maryland that has existed since the 1840s.

Since the 1990s, she has been named the Mary Julia Hall. She is located at Chestertown, Kent County, Maryland.

She was listed on the National Register of Historic Places in 1985.

References

External links
, including photo in 1984, at Maryland Historical Trust

Ships in Talbot County, Maryland
Ships on the National Register of Historic Places in Maryland
National Register of Historic Places in Talbot County, Maryland